Karima Abd-Daif (born 23 June 1965) is a Moroccan Norwegian politician for the Labour Party.

Born in Meknès, Morocco, she migrated to Norway and took an education in economics and French language at the Oslo University College and Bergen University College. She has been elected to Oslo city council several times.

She also serves as a deputy representative to the Norwegian Parliament from Oslo during the term 2005–2009.

References

1965 births
Living people
Moroccan emigrants to Norway
People from Meknes
Labour Party (Norway) politicians
Deputy members of the Storting
Politicians from Oslo
Oslo University College alumni
Bergen University College alumni